The 1999 All-Ireland Senior Hurling Championship (known for sponsorship reasons as the Guinness Hurling Championship) was the 113th staging of the All-Ireland Senior Hurling Championship, the Gaelic Athletic Association's premier inter-county hurling tournament. The draw for the fixtures took place on 15 November 1998. The championship began on 22 May 1999 and ended on 12 September 1999.

Offaly were the defending champions but were defeated by Cork in the All-Ireland semi-final. Meath, who had participated in the championship since 1993, declined to field a team.

On 12 September 1999, Cork won the championship following a 0–13 to 0–12 defeat of Kilkenny in the All-Ireland final. This was their 28th All-Ireland title, their first in nine championship seasons.

Cork's Joe Deane and Kilkenny's Henry Shefflin were the championship's top scorers with 1-24 apiece. Cork's Donal Óg Cusack and Offaly's Stephen Byrne were deemed the best goalkeepers after keeping three clean sheets each. Cork's Brian Corcoran was the choice for Hurler of the Year.

Participating counties

Managerial changes

Pre-championship

Connacht Senior Hurling Championship

Leinster Senior Hurling Championship

Munster Senior Hurling Championship

Ulster Senior Hurling Championship

All-Ireland Senior Hurling Championship

Championship statistics

Scoring

First goal of the championship: Paul Shelly for Tipperary against Kerry (Munster quarter-final)
Last goal of the championship: D.J. Carey for Kilkenny against Clare (All-Ireland semi-final)
Most goals in a match: 8
Derry 4-16 : 4-8 Down (Ulster semi-final)
Most points in a match: 39
Cork 0-24 : 1-15 Waterford (Munster semi-final)
Most goals by one team in a match: 6
Kilkenny 6-21 : 1-14 Laois (Leinster semi-final)
Most goals scored by a losing team: 4
Derry 4-16 : 4-8 Down (Ulster semi-final)
Most points scored by a losing team: 18
Clare 3-15 : 2-18 Galway (All-Ireland quarter-final)
Widest winning margin: 29 points
Tipperary 4-29 : 2-6 Kerry (Munster quarter-final)

Miscellaneous
 The All-Ireland final was decided for the first time ever with both sides failing to score a goal.

Top scorers

Overall

Single game

Clean sheets

Broadcasting

The following matches were broadcast live on television in Ireland on RTÉ.

External links
All-Ireland Senior Hurling Championship 1999 Results (Archived)

See also

1999
All-Ireland Senior Hurling Championship